Frederick Haviside Swan (July 28, 1902 – October 27, 1993) was an American football player and coach.  He was the 13th head football coach at Temple University, serving for one season, in 1939, compiling a record of 2–7.  Swan served as line coach at Temple under Pop Warner from 1933 for 1938 before succeeding him as head coach.

Head coaching record

References

1902 births
1993 deaths
American football guards
Colgate Raiders football coaches
Stanford Cardinal football players
Temple Owls football coaches
Wisconsin Badgers football coaches
Players of American football from San Francisco